Manuel Peña López (born 10 February 1998) is a professional Argentine tennis player. He made his ATP World Tour debut in the 2014 Düsseldorf Open.

External links 
 
 

1998 births
Living people
Argentine male tennis players
Sportspeople from Mendoza, Argentina
21st-century Argentine people